Amrasca is a genus of true bugs belonging to the family Cicadellidae.

The species of this genus are Southeastern Asia.

Species:
 Amrasca apicoserrata Sohi, 1977 
 Amrasca bella Dworakowska, 1977

References

Cicadellidae
Hemiptera genera